Leiferde (b Gifhorn) is a railway station located in Leiferde, Germany. The station is located on the Berlin-Lehrte Railway. The train services are operated by Metronom.

Train services
The station is serves by the following service(s):

Regional services  Hannover–Lehrte–Gifhorn–Wolfsburg

References

Railway stations in Lower Saxony